Slovenia competed at the 2006 Winter Olympics in Turin, Italy.

Alpine skiing 

Entering the Games, no Slovenian man was ranked in the top 20 of the World Cup standings in any alpine event, but they achieved several top-20 finishes in Turin, with the best a 12th place in the giant slalom from Mitja Valenčič. On the women's side, Tina Maze was ranked 5th in GS, but the top showing came from her team-mate Ana Drev, who posted one of the strongest second runs to end up 9th.

Men

Women

Biathlon 

The Slovenian flagbearer, Tadeja Brankovič, contributed to the biathlon team's top finish in Turin, the 6th place earned by the women's relay. Teja Gregorin was the best individual performer, placing in the top-20 in all of her races. The best performance in the relay, however, came from neither Brankovič nor Gregorin, but from Dijana Grudiček, who pulled the team up as high as 5th.

Cross-country skiing 

Petra Majdič was Slovenia's top cross-country skier in Turin, finishing 6th in the women's 10 km, and the only skier to proceed out of the qualifying rounds in the sprint. Majdič advanced to the semifinals, but placed 4th in her semi and in the B Final en route to an 8th place finish.

Distance

Sprint

Figure skating 

Urbas, who had placed 17th at the most recent European Championships, was second-to-last after the short program, and did not advance to compete in the free skate.

Key: CD = Compulsory Dance, FD = Free Dance, FS = Free Skate, OD = Original Dance, SP = Short Program

Freestyle skiing 

Miha Gale was scheduled to compete, but pulled out after an injury in training, leaving Nina Bednarik as the only Slovenian freestyle skier competing in Turin.

Luge 

Domen Pociecha was the only Slovenian lugist in Turin. He was one of the weaker starters, but nonetheless managed to finish 26th, ahead of 10 other competitors.

Nordic combined 

Damjan Vtič competed in two events as the sole Slovenian Nordic combined athlete in Turin; his best finish was 34th in the sprint.

Note: 'Deficit' refers to the amount of time behind the leader a competitor began the cross-country portion of the event. Italicized numbers show the final deficit from the winner's finishing time.

Ski jumping 

Slovenia was the defending Olympic and World bronze medalists in the team event, but struggled in Turin, finishing tenth, and not qualifying for the second round of jumps. Rok Benkovič, who was the defending world champion, in the normal hill event, had a very poor first jump in the final, ending up 49th. The best individual performance came from Jernej Damjan, who was 28th in the large hill event.

Note: PQ indicates a skier was pre-qualified for the final, based on entry rankings.

Snowboarding 

Four snowboarders represented Slovenia in Turin, all in the parallel giant slalom. Two, Rok Flander and Dejan Kosir, qualified for the knockout stages, and advanced to the quarterfinals before losing to a Schoch brother, Flander to Philipp and Kosir to Simon. The two ended up 7th and 6th, respectively, after each faced two other Swiss racers in the consolation rounds.

Parallel GS

Key: '+ Time' represents a deficit; the brackets indicate the results of each run.

References

Nations at the 2006 Winter Olympics
2006 Winter Olympics
Winter Olympics